Angel cake is a type of layer cake that originated in the United Kingdom, and first became popular in the late 19th century.

Made with butter, caster sugar, eggs, vanilla extract, self-raising flour, baking powder, and red and yellow food colouring, it consists of two or three layers of sweet butter cake which are often coloured white, pink and yellow. It is traditionally iced with a thin layer of white icing. To serve, long bars or small rectangular slices are usually cut.

The largest recorded Angel cake was 1 metre in length and 50 centimetres in width, which was baked in the English town of Bakewell.

See also
 List of cakes
 Victoria sponge cake

References

British cakes
Layer cakes
Butter cakes